Agus Prayogo (born 23 August 1985 in Bogor) is an Indonesian long-distance runner. He currently holds the Indonesian national records for the 3000 metres, 5000 metres, 10,000 metres, and half marathon.

Early life
Agus Prayogo is of Javanese descent, and was born in Bogor, West Java to Prayitno (father) and Supriyaningsih (mother). Prayogo spent his childhood in Magelang, Central Java. His talent for running was first identified while he was a student at PORSENI (Pekan Olahraga dan Seni) Elementary School. During junior high school (SMP), Prayogo moved to Salatiga and joined a local running club. After finishing his schooling, he enlisted in the Indonesian military. Prayogo is currently living in Bandung.

References

External links

1985 births
Living people
Indonesian male long-distance runners
People from Bogor
Southeast Asian Games medalists in athletics
Southeast Asian Games gold medalists for Indonesia
Southeast Asian Games silver medalists for Indonesia
Southeast Asian Games bronze medalists for Indonesia
Athletes (track and field) at the 2010 Asian Games
Athletes (track and field) at the 2018 Asian Games
Competitors at the 2003 Southeast Asian Games
Asian Games competitors for Indonesia
Competitors at the 2009 Southeast Asian Games
Competitors at the 2011 Southeast Asian Games
Competitors at the 2013 Southeast Asian Games
Competitors at the 2015 Southeast Asian Games
Competitors at the 2017 Southeast Asian Games
Competitors at the 2019 Southeast Asian Games